Symphonia Serena is an orchestral work composed by Paul Hindemith in 1946. It was premiered by the Dallas Symphony Orchestra on 2 February 1947 with Antal Dorati conducting. The work is organized into four movements:

 Moderately fast
 Geschwindmarsch by Beethoven, paraphrase
 Colloquy
 Finale

References

Compositions by Paul Hindemith
1946 compositions